Guy Delisle (born January 19, 1966) is a Canadian cartoonist and animator, best known for his graphic novels about his travels, such as Shenzhen (2000), Pyongyang: A Journey in North Korea (2003), Burma Chronicles (2007), and Jerusalem (2011).

Biography
Delisle studied animation at Sheridan College in Oakville, near Toronto, and then worked for the animation studio CinéGroupe in Montreal. He later worked for different studios in Canada, Germany, France, China and North Korea. 

His experiences as a supervisor of animation work by studios in Asia were recounted in two graphic novels, Shenzhen (2000) and Pyongyang: A Journey in North Korea (2003). The two books, Delisle's most famous work, were first published in French by the independent bande dessinée publisher L'Association. They have been translated into many languages, including Burmese, Croatian, Czech, English,  Finnish, German, Italian, Polish, Portuguese and Spanish.  A film version of Pyongyang starring Steve Carell was cancelled in December 2014 after the Sony Pictures Entertainment hack.

Delisle is married to a Médecins Sans Frontières administrator. With her, he made a trip to Myanmar (Burma) in 2005, which is recounted in Chroniques Birmanes (2007), translated into English as Burma Chronicles.

In the summer of 2009, they completed a one-year stay in Beit Hanina, Jerusalem, again with Médecins Sans Frontières. This stay was recounted in Chroniques de Jérusalem (2011) which won the Angoulême International Comics Festival Prize for Best Album in 2012. Amongst other things it covered the Gaza War. In France,  (English title: Jerusalem: Chronicles from the Holy City) was a best-seller.

In 2016, Delisle published S'enfuir. Récit d'un otage (Dargaud), translated into English as Hostage and published by Drawn & Quarterly in 2017. The graphic novel depicts the true story of Christophe André, a Médecins Sans Frontières administrator who was kidnapped in the Caucasus Region in 1997. Hostage was longlisted for Brooklyn Public Library's 2017 literary prize.

Delisle resides in Montpellier, France.

Bibliography

French language 
 Réflexion (L'Association, paperback, October 1996)
 Aline et les autres (L'Association, paperback, April 1999)
 Shenzhen (L'Association, paperback, April 2000)
 Inspecteur Moroni 1 : Premiers pas (Dargaud, paperback, March 2001)
 Albert et les autres (L'Association, paperback, June 2001)
 Inspecteur Moroni 2 : Avec ou sans sucre (Dargaud, paperback, April 2002)
 Comment ne rien faire (La Pastèque, paperback, August 2002, ; hardcover, November 2007)
 Pyongyang (L'Association, paperback, June 2003)
 Inspecteur Moroni 3 : Le Syndrome de Stockholm (Dargaud, paperback, July 2004)
 Louis au ski (Delcourt, paperback, November 2005)
 L'Association en Inde (L'Association, paperback, March 2007, with Frederik Peeters, Thiriet, Katja Tukiainen, and Matti Hagelberg)
 Chroniques birmanes (Delcourt, paperback, November 2007)
 Louis à la plage (Delcourt, paperback, August 2008)
 La maison close (Delcourt, paperback, January 2010, with Jérôme Mulot, Florent Ruppert, et al.)
 Chroniques de Jérusalem (Delcourt, paperback, November 2011)
 Le guide du mauvais père tome 1 (Delcourt, paperback, January 2013)
 Le guide du mauvais père tome 2 (Delcourt, paperback, January 2014)
 Papier 4 (Delcourt, paperback, September 2014, with Lewis Trondheim, Grégory Panaccione, et al.)
 Le guide du mauvais père tome 3 (Delcourt, paperback, January 2015)
 Croquis de Québec (Pow Pow, paperback, August 2016)
 S'enfuir. Récit d'un otage (Dargaud, paperback, September 2016)
 Le guide du mauvais père tome 4 (Delcourt, paperback, June 2018)
 Chroniques de jeunesse (Delcourt, paperback, January 2021)

English language translations 
 Pyongyang: A Journey in North Korea (Drawn & Quarterly, hardcover, September 2005, ; paperback, May 2007)
 Shenzhen: A Travelogue from China (Drawn & Quarterly, hardcover, October 2006, ; paperback, April 2012)
 Aline and the Others (Drawn & Quarterly, paperback, November 2006)
 Albert and the Others (Drawn & Quarterly, paperback, November 2007)
 Burma Chronicles (Drawn & Quarterly, hardcover, September 2008, ; paperback, September 2010)
 Jerusalem: Chronicles from the Holy City (Drawn & Quarterly, hardcover, April 2012, ; paperback, March 2015)
 A User's Guide to Neglectful Parenting (Drawn & Quarterly, paperback, June 2013)
 Even More Bad Parenting Advice (Drawn & Quarterly, paperback, August 2014)
 The Owner's Manual to Terrible Parenting (Drawn & Quarterly, paperback, October 2015)
 Hostage (Drawn & Quarterly, hardcover, April 2017)
 The Handbook to Lazy Parenting (Drawn & Quarterly, paperback, October 2019)
 Factory Summers (Drawn & Quarterly, hardcover, June 2021)
 World Record Holders (Drawn & Quarterly, paperback, August 2022)

References

External links

  
  
 Drawn & Quarterly profile

1966 births
Artists from Quebec City
Canadian graphic novelists
Living people
Canadian expatriates in France